The Japanese tea ceremony (known as  or ) is a Japanese cultural activity involving the ceremonial preparation and presentation of , powdered green tea, the procedure of which is called . While in the West it is known as "tea ceremony", it is seldom ceremonial in practice. Most often tea is served to family, friends, and associates; religious and ceremonial connotations are overstated in western spaces. The English term "Teaism" was coined by Okakura Kakuzō to describe the unique worldview associated with Japanese tea ceremony, as opposed to focusing just on the ceremonial aspect, a perspective that many practicioners frown upon.

Zen Buddhism was a primary influence in the development of the culture of Japanese tea.

Tea gatherings are classified as either an informal tea gathering or a formal tea gathering. A  is a relatively simple course of hospitality that includes confections, thin tea, and perhaps a light meal. A  is a much more formal gathering, usually including a full-course  meal followed by confections, thick tea, and thin tea. A  may last up to four hours.

History 

The first documented evidence of tea in Japan dates to the 9th century. It is found in an entry in the  having to do with the Buddhist monk , who had brought some tea back to Japan on his return from China. The entry states that Eichū personally prepared and served  (tea beverage made by steeping tea leaves in hot water) to Emperor Saga, who was on an excursion in Karasaki (in present Shiga Prefecture) in 815. By imperial order in 816, tea plantations began to be cultivated in the Kinki region of Japan. However, the interest in tea in Japan faded after this.

In China, tea had already been known, according to legend, for more than a thousand years. The form of tea popular in China in Eichū's time was  – tea compressed into a nugget in the same manner as  tea. This then would be ground in a mortar, and the resulting ground tea mixed together with various other herbs and flavourings. The custom of drinking tea, first for medicinal, and then largely for pleasurable reasons, was already widespread throughout China. In the early 9th century, Chinese author Lu Yu wrote The Classic of Tea, a treatise on tea focusing on its cultivation and preparation. Lu Yu's life had been heavily influenced by Buddhism, particularly the Zen–Chán Buddhist school. His ideas would have a strong influence in the development of the Japanese tea.

Around the end of the 12th century, the style of tea preparation called , in which powdered  was placed into a bowl, hot water added, and the tea and hot water whipped together, was introduced to Japan by Buddhist monk Eisai on his return from China. He also took tea seeds back with him, which eventually produced tea that was considered to be the most superb quality in all of Japan. This powdered green tea was first used in religious rituals in Buddhist monasteries. By the 13th century, when the Kamakura shogunate ruled the nation and tea and the luxuries associated with it became a kind of status symbol among the warrior class, there arose  parties wherein contestants could win extravagant prizes for guessing the best quality tea – that was grown in Kyoto, deriving from the seeds that Eisai brought from China.

This period, approximately 1336 to 1573, saw the budding of what is generally regarded as Japanese traditional culture as it is known today.

The use of Japanese tea developed as a "transformative practice" and began to evolve its own aesthetic, in particular that of  principles.  represents the inner, or spiritual, experiences of human lives. Its original meaning indicated quiet or sober refinement, or subdued taste "characterized by humility, restraint, simplicity, naturalism, profundity, imperfection, and asymmetry" and "emphasizes simple, unadorned objects and architectural space, and celebrates the mellow beauty that time and care impart to materials." 

, on the other hand, represents the outer, or material side of life. Originally, it meant "worn", "weathered", or "decayed".
Central are the concepts of omotenashi, which revolves around hospitality.

Murata Jukō is known in  history as an early developer of tea as a spiritual practice.

By the 16th century, tea drinking had spread to all levels of society in Japan. His teachings perfected many newly developed forms in architecture and gardens, art, and the full development of the "way of tea".

Sen no Rikyū was the leading teamaster of the regent Toyotomi Hideyoshi, who greatly supported him in codifying and spreading the way of tea, also as a means of solidifying his own political power. Hideyoshi's tastes were influenced by his teamaster, but nevertheless he also had his own ideas to cement his power such as constructing the Golden Tea Room and hosting the Grand Kitano Tea Ceremony in 1587. The symbiotic relationship between politics and tea was at its height. However, it was increasingly at odds with the rustic and simple aesthetics continuously advertised by his tea master, which the regent increasingly saw as a threat to cementing his own power and position, and their once close relationship began to suffer. 

In 1590, one of the leading disciples of Rikyu, Yamanoue Sōji, was brutally executed on orders of the regent. One year later the regent ordered his teamaster to commit ritual suicide. The way of tea was never so closely intertwined with politics before or after. After the death of Rikyū, essentially three schools descended from him to continue the tradition. The way of tea continued to spread throughout the country and later developed not only from the court and samurai class, but also towards the townspeople.

Venues

Japanese tea ceremonies are typically conducted in specially constructed spaces or rooms designed for the purpose of tea ceremony. While a purpose-built -floored room is considered the ideal venue, any place where the necessary implements for the making and serving of the tea can be set out and where the host can make the tea in the presence of the seated guest(s) can be used as a venue for tea.

A purpose-built  typically has a low ceiling, a hearth built into the floor, an alcove for hanging scrolls and placing other decorative objects, and separate entrances for host and guests.

A 4.5-mat room is considered standard, but smaller and larger rooms are also used. Building materials and decorations are deliberately simple and rustic in  style tea rooms.  can also refer to free-standing buildings for tea.

Seasons
Seasonality and the changing of the seasons are considered important for enjoyment of tea and tea ceremony. Traditionally, the year is divided by tea practitioners into two main seasons: the  season, constituting the colder months (traditionally November to April), and the  season, constituting the warmer months (traditionally May to October).

For each season, there are variations in the  performed and utensils and other equipment used.

Thick and thin tea
Historically, the tea leaves used as packing material for the  leaves in the  would be served as thin tea. The first documented appearance of the term  is in 1575.

Thin tea is served to each guest in an individual bowl, while one bowl of thick tea is shared among several guests. This style of sharing a bowl of  first appeared in historical documents in 1586, and is a method considered to have been invented by Sen no Rikyū.

Equipment 

The equipment for tea ceremony is called . All the tools for tea are handled with exquisite care, being scrupulously cleaned before and after each use and before storing, with some handled only with gloved hands. Some items, such as the tea storage jar (known as ), are so revered, that historically, they were given proper names like people, and were admired and documented by multiple diarists.

Some of the more essential components of tea ceremony are:

Procedures 
 
 

Procedures vary from school to school, and with the time of year, time of day, venue, and other considerations. The noon tea gathering of one host and a maximum of five guests is considered the most formal . The following is a general description of a noon  held in the cool weather season at a purpose-built tea house.

The guests arrive a little before the appointed time and enter an interior waiting room, where they store unneeded items such as coats, and put on fresh  socks.

When the last guest has taken their place, they close the door with an audible sound to alert the host, who enters the tea room and welcomes each guest, and then answers questions posed by the first guest about the scroll and other items.

The  begins in the cool months with the laying of the charcoal fire which is used to heat the water. After the meal, there is a break called a  during which the guests return to the waiting shelter until summoned again by the host, who uses the break to sweep the tea room, take down the scroll and replace it with a flower arrangement, open the tea room's shutters, and make preparations for serving the tea.

Having been summoned back to the tea room by the sound of a bell or gong rung in prescribed ways, the guests again purify themselves and examine the items placed in the tea room. The host then enters, ritually cleanses each utensil – including the tea bowl, whisk, and tea scoop – in the presence of the guests in a precise order and using prescribed motions, and places them in an exact arrangement according to the particular  procedure being performed. When the preparation of the utensils is complete, the host prepares thick tea.

Bows are exchanged between the host and the guest receiving the tea. The guest then bows to the second guest, and raises the bowl in a gesture of respect to the host. The guest rotates the bowl to avoid drinking from its front, takes a sip, and compliments the host on the tea. After taking a few sips, the guest wipes clean the rim of the bowl and passes it to the second guest. The procedure is repeated until all guests have taken tea from the same bowl; each guest then has an opportunity to admire the bowl before it is returned to the host, who then cleanses the equipment and leaves the tea room.

The host then rekindles the fire and adds more charcoal.

The host will then proceed with the preparation of an individual bowl of thin tea to be served to each guest. While in earlier portions of the gathering conversation is limited to a few formal comments exchanged between the first guest and the host, in the  portion, after a similar ritual exchange, the guests may engage in casual conversation.

After all the guests have taken tea, the host cleans the utensils in preparation for putting them away. The guest of honour will request that the host allow the guests to examine some of the utensils, and each guest in turn examines each item, including the tea caddy and the tea scoop. (This examination is done to show respect and admiration for the host.) The items are treated with extreme care and reverence as they may be priceless, irreplaceable, handmade antiques, and guests often use a special brocaded cloth to handle them.

The host then collects the utensils, and the guests leave the tea house. The host bows from the door, and the gathering is over. A tea gathering can last up to four hours, depending on the type of occasion performed, the number of guests, and the types of meal and tea served.

Types 

Every action in  – how a kettle is used, how a teacup is examined, how tea is scooped into a cup – is performed in a very specific way, and may be thought of as a procedure or technique.

Many of the items are smaller than usual, to fit in the box. This gathering takes approximately 35–40 minutes.

This is usually the first  learned, and is the easiest to perform, requiring neither much specialized equipment nor a lot of time to complete.

In the  style, the tea is prepared with the host kneeling at a special table, and the guests are also kneeling at tables. It is possible, therefore, for -style  to be conducted nearly anywhere, even outdoors. The name refers to the host's practice of performing the first and last bows while standing. In  there is usually an assistant who sits near the host and moves the host's seat out of the way as needed for standing or sitting. The assistant also serves the tea and sweets to the guests. This procedure originated in the Urasenke school, initially for serving non-Japanese guests who, it was thought, would be more comfortable sitting on chairs.

Essential elements

Tea room 

The Japanese traditional floor mats, are used in various ways in tea offerings. Their placement, for example, determines how a person walks through the tea room , and the different seating positions.

The use of  flooring has influenced the development of tea. For instance, when walking on  it is customary to shuffle, to avoid causing disturbance. Therefore, tea students are taught to step over such joins when walking in the tea room.

In a 4.5 mat room, the mats are placed in a circular pattern around a centre mat. Purpose-built tea rooms have a sunken hearth in the floor which is used in winter. A special  is used which has a cut-out section providing access to the hearth. In summer, the hearth is covered either with a small square of extra , or, more commonly, the hearth  is replaced with a full mat, totally hiding the hearth.

It is customary to avoid stepping on this centre mat whenever possible, as well as to avoid placing the hands palm-down on it, as it functions as a kind of table: tea utensils are placed on it for viewing, and prepared bowls of tea are placed on it for serving to the guests. To avoid stepping on it people may walk around it on the other mats, or shuffle on the hands and knees.

Except when walking, when moving about on the tatami one places one's closed fists on the mats and uses them to pull oneself forward or push backwards while maintaining a  position.

There are dozens of real and imaginary lines that crisscross any tearoom. These are used to determine the exact placement of utensils and myriad other details; when performed by skilled practitioners, the placement of utensils will vary minutely from gathering to gathering. The  are used as one guide for placement, and the joins serve as a demarcation indicating where people should sit.

 provide a more comfortable surface for sitting -style. At certain times of year (primarily during the new year's festivities) the portions of the  where guests sit may be covered with a red felt cloth.

Hanging scroll

Calligraphy, mainly in the form of hanging scrolls, plays a central role in tea. They are selected for their appropriateness for the occasion, including the season and the theme of the particular get-together. Calligraphic scrolls may feature well-known sayings, particularly those associated with Buddhism, poems, descriptions of famous places, or words or phrases associated with tea.

Historian and author Haga Kōshirō points out that it is clear from the teachings of Sen no Rikyū recorded in the  that the suitability of any particular scroll for a tea gathering depends not only on the subject of the writing itself but also on the virtue of the writer. Haga points out that Rikyū preferred to hang  ("ink traces"), the calligraphy of Zen Buddhist priests, in the tea room. A typical example of a hanging scroll in a tea room might have the kanji , expressing the four key principles of the Way of Tea. Some contain only a single character; in summer,  would be appropriate. Hanging scrolls that feature a painting instead of calligraphy, or a combination of both, are also used. Scrolls are sometimes placed in the waiting room as well.

Flower arrangement

It evolved from the "free-form" style of  called , which was used by early tea masters.  is said, depending upon the source, to have been either developed or championed by Sen no Rikyū. He is said to have taught that  should give the viewer the same impression that those flowers naturally would give if they were still growing outdoors, in nature.

Unnatural or out-of-season materials are never used, as well as props and other devices. In the summer, when many flowering grasses are in season in Japan, however, it is seasonally appropriate to arrange a number of such flowering grasses in an airy basket-type container.

 arrangements are so simple that frequently no more than a single blossom is used; this blossom will invariably lean towards or face the guests.

Meal

In , only fresh seasonal ingredients are used, prepared in ways that aim to enhance their flavour. Great care is taken in selecting ingredients and types of food, and the finished dishes are carefully presented on serving ware that is chosen to enhance the appearance and seasonal theme of the meal. Dishes are intricately arranged and garnished, often with real edible leaves and flowers that are to help enhance the flavour of the food. Serving ware and garnishes are as much a part of the  experience as the food; some might argue that the aesthetic experience of seeing the food is even more important than the physical experience of eating it.

Courses are served in small servings in individual dishes. Each diner has a small lacquered tray to themselves; very important people may be provided their own low, lacquered table or several small tables.

Because  generally follows traditional eating habits in Japan, meat dishes are rare.

Clothing

Many of the movements and components of tea ceremonies evolved from the wearing of kimono. For example, certain movements are designed to keep dangling sleeves out of the way or prevent them from becoming dirty.

For this reason, most tea ceremonies are conducted in kimono, and though students may practice wearing Western clothes, students of tea ceremony will need to wear kimono at some point. On formal occasions, the host of the tea ceremony will always wear kimono, and for guests, formal kimono or Western formal wear must be worn. No matter the style of clothing, the attire worn at a tea gathering is usually subdued and conservative, so as not to be distracting.

Lined kimono are worn by both men and women in the winter months, and unlined kimono are worn in the summer. For formal occasions,  (kimono with three to five family crests on the sleeves and back) are worn. Both men and women wear white  (divided-toe socks).

Schools 

In Japan, those who wish to study tea ceremony typically join a "circle", a generic term for a group that meets regularly to participate in a given activity. There are also tea clubs at many junior and high schools, colleges and universities.

Classes may be held at community centres, dedicated tea schools, or at private homes. Tea schools often teach a wide variety of pupils who may study at different times; for example, the school may have a group for women, a group for older students, and a group for younger students. Students normally pay a monthly fee which covers tuition and the use of the school's (or teacher's) bowls and other equipment, the tea itself, and the sweets that students serve and eat at every class.

Though some groups and practitioners of tea ceremony may wear Western clothing, for most occasions of tea ceremony – particularly if the teacher is highly ranked within the tradition – wearing kimono is mostly considered essential, in particular for women. In some cases, advanced students may be given permission to wear the school's mark in place of the usual family crests on formal kimono.

New students typically begin by observing more advanced students as they practice. New students may be taught mostly by more advanced students; the most advanced students are taught exclusively by the teacher. As they master these essential steps, students are also taught how to behave as a guest at tea ceremonies: the correct words to say, how to handle bowls, how to drink tea and eat sweets, how to use paper and sweet-picks, and myriad other details.

As they master the basics, students will be instructed on how to prepare the powdered tea for use, how to fill the tea caddy, and finally, how to measure the tea and water and whisk it to the proper consistency. Only when the first offering has been mastered will students move on. Study is through observation and hands on practice; students do not often take notes, and many teachers discourage the practice of note-taking.

As they master each offering, some schools and teachers present students with certificates at a formal ceremony. According to the school, this certificate may warrant that the student has mastered a given , or may give the student permission to begin studying a given . Acquiring such certificates is often very costly; the student typically must not only pay for the preparation of the certificate itself and for participating in the gathering during which it is bestowed, but is also expected to thank the teacher by presenting him or her with a gift of money. The cost of acquiring certificates increases as the student's level increases.

Related topics include incense and kimono, or comments on seasonal variations in equipment or offerings.

This offering, more Chinese in style, was introduced to Japan in the 17th century by Ingen, the founder of the Ōbaku school of Zen Buddhism, also more Chinese in style than earlier schools. In the 18th century, it was popularized by the Ōbaku monk Baisao, who sold tea in Kyoto, and later came to be regarded as the first  master. It remains associated with the Ōbaku school, and the head temple of Manpuku-ji hosts regular  tea conventions.

See also 
 Higashiyama culture in Muromachi period
 Japanese tea classics
 Japanese tea utensils, for a full list of utensils used in Japanese tea
 , for information about the tea itself 
 
 East Asian tea ceremony, for tea ceremony in East Asian culture as a whole 
Tea ware

References

Further reading 
  "History of Japan", section "Azuchi-Momoyama History (1568-1600)", particularly the part therein on "The Culture of the Period".

External links 

 Japanese Tea Ceremony – Vast source of information with detailed explanation of preparation steps.
  Documentary with teamaster Soyu Yumi Mukai